Amouri is a village and a community of the Lamia municipality. Before the 2011 local government reform it was a part of the municipality of Leianokladi, of which it was a municipal district. The 2011 census recorded 278 inhabitants in the village. The community of Amouri covers an area of 6.901 km2.

Population
According to the 2011 census, the population of the settlement of Amouri was 278 people, a decrease of almost 27% compared with the population of the previous census of 2001.

See also
 List of settlements in Phthiotis

References

Populated places in Phthiotis